Robert E. Horn (born 1933) is an American political scientist who taught at Harvard, Columbia, and Sheffield (U.K.) universities, and has been a visiting scholar at Stanford University's Center for the Study of Language and Information. He is known for the development of information mapping.

Overview 
Bob Horn is perhaps best known for his development of information mapping, a method of information development called structured writing suited especially for technical communication.

His latest contributions to the presentation of information have been in the field of visual language. Horn has extended the use of visual language and visual analytics to develop methods—involving large, detailed infographics and argument map murals—for exploring and resolving wicked problems.

Selected publications

References

External links 
 
 http://www.bobhorn.us

1933 births
Technical communication
Information visualization experts
Harvard University faculty
Columbia University faculty
Stanford University faculty
Living people
American political scientists